The Planck relation (referred to as Planck's energy–frequency relation, the Planck–Einstein relation, Planck equation, and Planck formula, though the latter might also refer to Planck's law) is a fundamental equation in quantum mechanics which states that the energy of a photon, known as photon energy, is proportional to its frequency, :

The constant of proportionality, is known as the Planck constant. Several equivalent forms of the relation exist, including in terms of angular frequency, :

where . The relation accounts for the quantized nature of light and plays a key role in understanding phenomena such as the photoelectric effect and black-body radiation (where the related Planck postulate can be used to derive Planck's law).

Spectral forms
Light can be characterized using several spectral quantities, such as frequency  , wavelength , wavenumber , and their angular equivalents (angular frequency , angular wavelength , and angular wavenumber ). These quantities are related through

so the Planck relation can take the following 'standard' forms

as well as the following 'angular' forms,

The standard forms make use of the Planck constant . The angular forms make use of the reduced Planck constant . Here  is the speed of light.

de Broglie relation

The de Broglie relation, also known as the de Broglie's momentum–wavelength relation, generalizes the Planck relation to matter waves. Combining de Broglie's postulate with the Planck–Einstein relation leads to
 or 

The de Broglie's relation is also often encountered in vector form

Bohr's frequency condition
Bohr's frequency condition states that the frequency of a photon absorbed or emitted during an electronic transition is related to the energy difference between the two energy levels involved in the transition:

This is a direct consequence of the Planck–Einstein relation.

See also
 Compton wavelength

References

Cited bibliography
Cohen-Tannoudji, C., Diu, B., Laloë, F. (1973/1977). Quantum Mechanics, translated from the French by S.R. Hemley, N. Ostrowsky, D. Ostrowsky, second edition, volume 1, Wiley, New York, .
French, A.P., Taylor, E.F. (1978). An Introduction to Quantum Physics, Van Nostrand Reinhold, London, .
Griffiths, D.J. (1995). Introduction to Quantum Mechanics, Prentice Hall, Upper Saddle River NJ, .
Landé, A. (1951). Quantum Mechanics, Sir Isaac Pitman & Sons, London.
Landsberg, P.T. (1978). Thermodynamics and Statistical Mechanics, Oxford University Press, Oxford UK, .
Messiah, A. (1958/1961). Quantum Mechanics, volume 1, translated from the French by G.M. Temmer, North-Holland, Amsterdam.
Schwinger, J. (2001). Quantum Mechanics: Symbolism of Atomic Measurements, edited by B.-G. Englert, Springer, Berlin, .
van der Waerden, B.L. (1967). Sources of Quantum Mechanics, edited with a historical introduction by B.L. van der Waerden, North-Holland Publishing, Amsterdam.
Weinberg, S. (1995). The Quantum Theory of Fields, volume 1, Foundations, Cambridge University Press, Cambridge UK, .
Weinberg, S. (2013). Lectures on Quantum Mechanics, Cambridge University Press, Cambridge UK, .

Foundational quantum physics
Max Planck